Germany's federal system comprises 16 state parliaments (the German terms are: Landtag in large states, Bürgerschaft in Bremen and Hamburg, Abgeordnetenhaus in Berlin), each including directly elected representatives.

Parties in each parliament

In the table below, the parties forming part of the state government are shaded and the party of the head of government is also in bold.

Diagrams

See also
 Minister president (Germany)
 Politics of Germany
 Federalism in Germany
 States of Germany

References

Subdivisions of Germany
State legislatures of Germany